The 2011 Alessandria Challenger was a professional tennis tournament played on clay courts. It was the fourth edition of the tournament which is part of the 2011 ATP Challenger Tour. It took place in Alessandria, Italy between 23 and 29 May 2011.

ATP entrants

Seeds

 Rankings are as of May 16, 2011.

Other entrants
The following players received wildcards into the singles main draw:
  Sergei Bubka
  Alessandro Giannessi
  Gianluca Naso
  Matteo Trevisan

The following players received entry as an alternate into the singles main draw:
  Ruben Bemelmans

The following players received entry as a special exempt into the singles main draw:
  Pablo Carreño Busta

The following players received entry from the qualifying draw:
  Evgeny Korolev
  Iván Navarro
  Peter Polansky
  Jesse Witten

Champions

Singles

 Pablo Carreño Busta def.  Roberto Bautista Agut, 3–6, 6–3, 7–5

Doubles

 Martin Fischer /  Philipp Oswald def.  Jeff Coetzee /  Andreas Siljeström, 6–7(5), 7–5, [10–6]

External links
Official Website
ITF Search
ATP official site

Alessandria Challenger
Clay court tennis tournaments
Alessandria Challenger